Charles Inglis may refer to:

Charles Inglis (c. 1731–1791), Royal Navy officer
Charles Inglis (d. 1833), Royal Navy officer, son of the above
Charles Inglis (bishop) (1734–1816), Anglican clergyman, first Church of England bishop of Nova Scotia
Charles Inglis (engineer) (1875–1952), civil engineer
Charles M. Inglis (1870-1954), naturalist and curator of the Darjeeling museum in India
Charles A. Inglis was the alias used by German spy Carl Hans Lody